Events in the year 1592 in Norway.

Incumbents
Monarch: Christian IV

Events

Arts and literature

Births
Axel Mowat, admiral and land owner (died 1661).

Deaths

Oluf Kalips, nobleman, landowner and Chancellor of Norway.

See also

References